Fissurella latimarginata is a species of sea snail, a marine gastropod mollusk in the family Fissurellidae, the keyhole limpets.

Description
The size of an adult shell varies between 50 mm and 100 mm.

Distribution
This species occurs in the Pacific Ocean off Peru and Chile.

References

 Petit R.E. (2009) George Brettingham Sowerby, I, II & III: their conchological publications and molluscan taxa. Zootaxa 2189: 1–218

External links
  McLean J.H. (1984) Systematics of Fissurella in the Peruvian and Magellanic faunal provinces (Gastropoda: Prosobranchia). Contributions in Science, Natural History Museum of Los Angeles County 354: 1–70, p. 49. (29 October 1984) 
 

Fissurellidae
Gastropods described in 1835